Dmitry Lapin (born 28 July 1977) is a Kyrgyzstani freestyle swimmer. He competed in three events at the 1996 Summer Olympics.

References

External links
 

1977 births
Living people
Kyrgyzstani male freestyle swimmers
Olympic swimmers of Kyrgyzstan
Swimmers at the 1996 Summer Olympics
Place of birth missing (living people)